Keystone State Park can refer to either of two state parks in the United States:

Keystone State Park (Oklahoma)
Keystone State Park (Pennsylvania)